Kiss of Fire is a 1955 American Western film directed by Joseph M. Newman and starring Jack Palance and Barbara Rush. Based on the novel "The Rose and the Flame" by Jonreed Lauritzen (Garden City, NY, 1951).

Plot
A noble Spaniard (Jack Palance) escorts a Spanish princess (Barbara Rush) from New Mexico to a ship in California.

Cast
 Jack Palance as El Tigre
 Barbara Rush as Princess Lucia
 Rex Reason as Duke of Montera
 Martha Hyer as Felicia
 Leslie Bradley as Baron Vega
 Alan Reed as Sergeant Diego
 Lawrence Dobkin as Padre Domingo
 Joseph Waring as Victor
 Pat Hogan as Chief Pahvant
 Karen Kadler as Shining Moon
 Steven Geray as Ship Captain Belkin
 Henry Rowland as Acosta

See also
 List of American films of 1955

References

External links
 
 

1955 films
1955 Western (genre) films
American Western (genre) films
1950s English-language films
Films directed by Joseph M. Newman
United Artists films
1950s American films